Chatzigeorgiou, Hatzigeorgiou, or Hadjigeorgiou is a Greek surname.

Menelaos Chatzigeorgiou (1924–2020), Greek sportsman and politician
Takis Hadjigeorgiou (born 1956), Cypriot politician
Michel Hatzigeorgiou (born 1961), Belgian musician

Given name
Chatzigeorgios, Hatzigeorgios, or Hadjigeorgios can also be a Greek given name. People with the name include:

Hadji-Georgis the Athonite (1809-1886), Cappadocian Greek monk

See also
Hatzi

Greek-language surnames